

Flora

Ferns and fern allies

Angiosperms

Arthropods

Insects

Conodonts

Archosauriformes

Non-avian dinosaurs
Data courtesy of George Olshevsky's dinosaur genera list.

Birds

Sauropterygians

Plesiosaurs

Synapsids

Mammaliformes

References

 
Paleontology
Paleontology 8